Israel competed at the 2002 Winter Olympics in Salt Lake City, United States.

The Israeli delegation included 5 athletes. 2 pairs of ice dancers: Galit Chait and Sergei Sakhnovski, who were ranked in 6th place, and Natalia Gudina and Alexei Beletski, who were 19th. Olga Danilova competed in short track speed skating.

Results by event

Figure skating

Short track speed skating

References

Nations at the 2002 Winter Olympics
2002 Winter Olympics
Winter Olympics